William S. Holabird (c. 1794 – May 20, 1855) was an American lawyer, politician and the 37th Lieutenant Governor of Connecticut.

Early life
William S. Holabird was born circa 1794 reportedly at Canaan, Connecticut, the son of William D. Holabird and his wife, the former Dorcas Bird. He married Adeline/Adaline Catlin, daughter of Abijah and Orinda (Williams) Catlin.

Career
In 1831 and 1833 he was unsuccessful as a Democratic candidate for Congress and was appointed by Andrew Jackson in 1834 as U.S. Attorney for the District of Connecticut. As such he presented the government's argument in the Amistad case.

Holabird was later elected the Lieutenant Governor of Connecticut for two consecutive terms, serving from May 4, 1842, to May 1, 1844, while Chauncey Fitch Cleveland was governor. Cleveland was succeeded as governor in 1844 by Roger S. Baldwin from the Whig party. Baldwin was known for his defence in the Amistad Case, where Holabird had been the government's attorney.

William S. Holabird died at Winchester, Litchfield County, Connecticut, on May 20, 1855.

In popular culture
A simplified version of the events regarding the Amistad case was made into a movie called Amistad in 1997 in which Pete Postlethwaite portrayed William S. Holabird.

See also
List of lieutenant governors of Connecticut

Sources
Brief Descriptions of Connecticut State Agencies, Lieutenant Governor

References

Lieutenant Governors of Connecticut
United States Attorneys for the District of Connecticut
Connecticut Democrats
Year of birth uncertain
1855 deaths
People from Canaan, Connecticut
La Amistad
1794 births